Agustín Figuerola (born January 27, 1985) is an Argentine rugby union footballer for Brive in the Top 14. He has played at both scrum-half and fly-half. He has also played for Argentina.

External links
 
 Scrum.com
 

1985 births
Living people
Rugby union players from Buenos Aires
CA Brive players
Pampas XV players
Rugby union scrum-halves
Argentine rugby union players
Argentina international rugby union players
Expatriate rugby union players in France
Argentine expatriate sportspeople in France
Argentine expatriate rugby union players
Argentina international rugby sevens players